

Competition history

3x3 world cup
  2022 qualified

Scores

3x3 world cup

The Mongolia men's national under-18 basketball team is a national basketball team of Mongolia, administered by the Mongolian Basketball Association.
It represents the country in international under-18 (under age 18) basketball competitions.

See also
Mongolia men's national basketball team
Mongolia women's national under-18 basketball team

References

External links
 Archived records of Mongolia team participations

U-18
Men's national under-18 basketball teams